Song Nina (born April 7, 1980) is a Chinese volleyball player who competed in the 2004 Summer Olympics.

In 2004, Nina was a member of the Chinese team which won the gold medal in the Olympic tournament.

External links
 sports-reference.com

1980 births
Living people
Olympic volleyball players of China
Volleyball players at the 2004 Summer Olympics
Olympic gold medalists for China
Olympic medalists in volleyball
Volleyball players from Liaoning
Sportspeople from Anshan
Medalists at the 2004 Summer Olympics
Asian Games medalists in volleyball
Volleyball players at the 2002 Asian Games
Volleyball players at the 2006 Asian Games
Chinese women's volleyball players
Asian Games gold medalists for China
Medalists at the 2002 Asian Games
Medalists at the 2006 Asian Games
21st-century Chinese women